William Michael Hegarty (born June 30, 1931) is a former American football offensive tackle in the National Football League for the Pittsburgh Steelers and the Washington Redskins.  He played college football at the University of Georgia and Villanova University and was drafted in the fifteenth round of the 1952 NFL Draft by the Los Angeles Rams.

References

1931 births
Players of American football from Massachusetts
American football offensive tackles
Georgia Bulldogs football players
Villanova Wildcats football players
Pittsburgh Steelers players
Washington Redskins players
Living people